A business idea is a concept that can be used for financial gain that is usually centered on a product or service that can be offered for money. An idea is the first milestone in the process of building a successful business.

The characteristics of a promising business idea are:
 Innovative
 Unique
 Problem solving
 Profitable
Understandable
A business idea is often linked to its creator who needs to identify the business's value proposition in order to launch to market and establish competitive advantage.

Meaning of innovation 
For businesses, this could mean: creating new ideas, new product development through research and development, or improving existing services. Innovation can be the central focus of a business and this can help them to grow and become a market leader if they execute their ideas properly. Businesses that are focused on innovation are usually more efficient, cost-effective, and productive. Successful innovation should be built into the business strategy, where you can create a culture of innovation and drive forward creative problem-solving.

Examples of innovation

 Apple was a $2 billion company in 1997, then it jumped to a $700 billion valuation in 2015 as a result of the innovation that came from the Macbook, iPod, iPad, and iPhone.
 Tesla built an electric car with exceptional aesthetics and efficiency, which has helped build the electric sports car company earn a market capitalization of $33 billion, with revenues up 54% since 2014.
 Uber was founded in 2009 and has become a $50 billion company in just 6 years, with its simple yet unusual idea of getting a taxi with the press of a button that has completely revolutionized the way we book taxis.

These successful companies were built on sheer innovation and we can see how valuable they have become in the short time they have been around or have been focusing on innovation. When Tesla's value is compared to that of General Motors, we see that the market capitalization of General Motors is $53.98 billion today  in which the company has been around since 1908  whereas Tesla was founded in 2003  and has achieved 50% of General Motors value within 12 years.

Unique selling proposition 
A unique selling point (USP) is the factor that makes a company or a product stand out from its competitors, whether it is through; pricing, quality, customer service or innovation.

Each successful company has a unique selling proposition (USP). A USP can be created through the element of being first to a market, for example Uber was the first company to allow for taxicab hailing via mobile app. Because Uber had reached this market first, it had a USP and therefore it received loyal customers. However; with fierce competition copying Uber's business model, Uber has had to develop its service through innovation.

Problem solving 
Business ideas that solve problems are fundamental to developing the world and companies such as Curemark are one of many who do this. Curemark is a biotech company founded by Joan Fallon, who noticed that a lot of the children she treated were low on an enzyme for processing protein and since then she has quit her job and has built Curemark to solve this problem. Curemark has now raised $50 million and is on its way to solving a problem that truly exists.

Profitability 
Profitability is a business's ability to generate earnings compared to its costs over a certain period of time. This is possibly the most important aspect of any business idea in the long term, as this is what makes a business survive in order to keep having the impact that it has. Profitable ideas need a strong revenue stream against its costs and this tends to create the success of the business, however, some companies defy this and make losses to begin with, yet are still exceptional business ideas that are worth billions.

High valued companies making a loss 

 Snapchat is valued at $10 billion  despite making a loss, because of the monetization potential it has based on the 100 million everyday users of the app.
 Uber is valued at $50 billion and is making a $417 million operating loss. Despite this, investors are still willing to offer large amounts of money to fund the company because of the potential the company has in the longer term.

See also
Business opportunity
Minimum viable product
Viability study

References 

Innovation